The 1901 Texas Longhorns football team was an American football team that represented the University of Texas as an independent during the 1901 college football season. In its second year under head coach Samuel Huston Thompson, the team compiled an 8–2–1 record, shut out seven opponents, and outscored opponents by a collective total of 153 to 71. The team played its home games at Varsity Athletic Field on the school's campus in Austin, Texas.

Schedule

References

Texas
Texas Longhorns football seasons
Texas Longhorns football